Alan R. Pratt (born 1953) is a Professor of Humanities at Embry–Riddle University. He is known for his research on existential nihilism and meaning of life.

Books
 Tales of Florida Fishes, Zane Grey's West Society, 2016 (contributing editor)
 The Critical Response to Andy Warhol, New York: Greenwood Press, 1997 (contributing editor)
 The Dark Side: Thoughts on the Futility of Life from the Ancient Greeks to the Present, New York: Citadel Press, 1994
 Black Humor: Critical Essays, New York: Garland Publishing, Inc., 1993 (contributing editor)

See also
 nihilism

References

External links
 Alan Pratt at Embry-Riddle University
 Internet Encyclopedia of Philosophy: Nihilism
 Modern America and Its Discontents: The Ride-Hard, Die-Free Fantasy of Bike Week

University of West Florida alumni
Florida State University alumni
Embry–Riddle Aeronautical University faculty
21st-century American philosophers
Phenomenologists
Continental philosophers
Philosophers of culture
Philosophers of nihilism
Philosophers from Florida
Existentialists
Philosophy academics
Heidegger scholars
Living people
Place of birth missing (living people)
1953 births